Live at Texas Stadium is a live album by Alan Jackson, George Strait and Jimmy Buffett. It was recorded during a concert at Texas Stadium that took place on May 29, 2004. The album was released by Mailboat Records on April 3, 2007.

Track listing

Personnel

 Monty Allen – background vocals
 Anthony Bazzani – keyboards
 Jimmy Buffett – lead vocals, acoustic guitar, electric guitar
 Mike Daily – steel guitar
 Gene Elders – fiddle
 Robbie Flint – steel guitar
 Dave Gaylord – fiddle, mandolin, background vocals
 Doyle Grisham – steel guitar
 Danny Groah – electric guitar
 Tina Gullickson – acoustic guitar, background vocals
 Roger Guth – drums
 Terry Hale – bass guitar
 Wes Hightower – background vocals
 Ronnie Huckaby – piano
 Alan Jackson – acoustic guitar, lead vocals
 Dan Kelley – fiddle, mandolin
 Mike Kennedy – drums
 John Lovell – trumpet
 Ralph MacDonald – percussion
 Mac McAnally – acoustic guitar, background vocals
 Rick McRae – electric guitar
 Jim Mayer – bass guitar, background vocals
 Monty Perkey – keyboards
 Bill Payne – piano
 Bruce Rutherford – drums
 Tom Rutledge – acoustic guitar, resonator guitar
 Nadirah Shakoor – background vocals
 Marty Slayton – background vocals
 Tony Stephens – harmonica
 George Strait – lead vocals, acoustic guitar
 Jeff Sturms – acoustic guitar
 Michael Utley – keyboards, background vocals
 Roger Wills – bass guitar

Charts
Live at Texas Stadium debuted at number 11 on the U.S. Billboard 200 and number 4 on the Top Country Albums.

Weekly charts

Year-end charts

References

2007 live albums
Alan Jackson albums
George Strait live albums
Jimmy Buffett live albums
Mailboat Records live albums
Collaborative albums
Albums produced by Michael Utley